Sit Down and Talk to Me is a 1980 album by American R&B singer Lou Rawls, released on the Philadelphia International Records label.  All of PIR's major production names contributed to the album, resulting in a diverse set of tracks from dance to urban blues.  Although Sit Down and Talk to Me did not produce any major hit singles, its commercial performance was adequate, peaking at #19 R&B and #81 pop.

Track listing 
 "One Day Soon You'll Need Me" (Gene McFadden, John Whitehead, Jerry Cohen) – 4:38
 "Heartache (Just When You Think You're Loved)" (Thom Bell, LeRoy Bell, Anthony Bell) – 4:43
 "Ain't That Loving You (For More Reasons Than One)" (Homer Banks, Allen Jones) – 4:39
 "When You Get Home" (Bunny Sigler, Ron Tyson) – 4:51
 "Sit Down and Talk to Me" (Gamble, Huff) – 4:53
 "You're My Blessing" (Gamble, Huff) – 4:22
 "Old Times" (Dexter Wansel, Cynthia Biggs) – 4:26
 "You Are" (Thom Bell, LeRoy Bell, Casey James, Jack Robinson) – 4:50

Singles 
"Ain't That Loving You (For More Reasons Than One)" (US R&B #57)
"Sit Down and Talk to Me" (US R&B #26)
"You're My Blessing" (US Pop #77)

References 

1980 albums
Lou Rawls albums
Albums produced by Kenneth Gamble
Albums produced by Leon Huff
Albums produced by Thom Bell
Albums recorded at Sigma Sound Studios
Philadelphia International Records albums